Rolf is a black Savannah cat, born on 20 December 2015,
whose home is close to the University of Warwick in the UK.
He is officially recognised by the university as their "campus cat".

Originally Rolf made his own way to the university campus, located half a mile away from his original home, where he would be missing for several days. There he'd roam freely visiting more than 25 different departments and breaking into buildings, which he is said to be an expert at.
In February 2019, Rolf was badly injured in a road accident on campus, when his life was saved by a medical student.
After his recovery, Rolf was equipped with a GPS tracker and a high-visibility vest, allowing him to return to campus in increased safety.

As of 2022, Rolf is accompanied by one of "his humans" on a leash when he visits campus.  He attends University events including organised "cat cafés" where he meets students and promotes their mental well-being.

See also
 List of individual cats

References

External links
 

Cat mascots
Individual cats in England
University of Warwick